The 2006 United States House of Representatives elections in New Jersey were held on November 4, 2006, to determine who will represent the state of New Jersey in the United States House of Representatives. New Jersey has thirteen seats in the House, apportioned according to the 2000 United States Census. Representatives are elected for two-year terms.

Overview

District 1 

Incumbent Democrat Rob Andrews won unopposed. This district covers Camden County.

District 2 

Incumbent Republican Frank A. LoBiondo defeated Democrat Viola Thomas-Hughes. This district covers the southern part of the state.

District 3 

Incumbent Republican Jim Saxton defeated Democrat Rich Sexton. The district covers Burlington and Ocean counties.

District 4 

Incumbent Republican Chris Smith defeated Democrat Carol Gay. This district covers 4 counties in the central part of the state.

District 5 

Republican incumbent Scott Garrett defeated Democratic nominee Paul Aronsohn. This district covers the northern border of the state.

During the primaries, Aronsohn was sued for libel by his Democratic primary opponent, Camille Abate. Aronsohn claimed in a press release that Abate had never previously been a registered Democrat. Abate countered that she was a registered Democrat when she originally registered to vote at age 18 and when she lived out of state. Aronsohn defeated Abate 66% to 33%.

District 6 

Incumbent Democrat Frank Pallone defeated Republican Leigh-Ann Bellew. This district covers mostly Monmouth and Middlesex counties.

District 7 

Incumbent Republican Mike Ferguson defeated Democrat Linda Stender. This district covers 4 counties in the northern part of the state.

District 8 

Incumbent Democrat Bill Pascrell defeated Republican Jose Sandoval. This district covers Essex and Possaic counties.

District 9 

Incumbent Democrat Steve Rothman defeated Republican Vincent Micco. This district covers mostly Bergen county.

District 10 
 
Incumbent Democrat Donald M. Payne won unopposed. This district covers a heavily urbanized area, which includes the city of Newark.

District 11 

Incumbent Republican Rodney Frelinghuysen defeated Democrat Tom Wyka. This district covers mostly Morris county.

District 12 

Incumbent Democrat Rush Holt defeated Republican Joseph Sinagra. This district covers 5 suburban counties in the central part of the state.

District 13 

Albio Sires, the Speaker of the State Assembly, defeated John Guarini, a salesman. This was also a special election to complete the last two months of the term of Incumbent Democrat Bob Menendez, who resigned to become a U.S. Senator.

References 

Washington Post

.

2006 New Jersey elections
New Jersey
2006